John "Jack" Egan is an American retired basketball player. His playing career is best remembered for his role on the 1962–63 Loyola Ramblers men's basketball team, which won the 1963 NCAA Championship. Egan was the lone white starting player on a team that broke racial barriers by starting four black players in an era when two or three was considered the maximum.

After college, Egan played three years in the short-lived North American Basketball League before retiring from basketball to work as a lawyer.

In 2002, Egan was inducted into the Chicagoland Sports Hall of Fame. The entire 1962–63 Loyola Ramblers team was inducted into the National Collegiate Basketball Hall of Fame in 2013.

Early life 
John Egan was born in the early 1940s and grew up in the South Side of Chicago. He was the second-oldest of nine children born to his parents, a police officer and a stay-at-home mother. Egan started playing basketball in elementary school. He played for St. Rita High School, but they never made it past the sectionals of the city tournament. In high school, Egan was scouted by the University of Iowa starting from junior year. The school ultimately offered him a one-year scholarship, but Egan felt he had outplayed others who were given full scholarships, and declined. He was later scouted by Loyola-Chicago coach George Ireland at a Catholic League All-Star game and eventually offered a full scholarship, which he accepted.

College career 

Egan played for Loyola-Chicago starting in the 1961–62 season. That season he played in 27 games and averaged 13.7 points per game.

In the 1962–63 season, Loyola went 24–2 in the regular season, then went on to win the 1963 NCAA University Division basketball tournament. Egan again averaged 13.7 points across 31 games.

In the 1963–64 season, Egan averaged 18.5 points across 28 games. Loyola finished 22–5 but lost in the second round of the NCAA Tournament to Michigan, which Egan attributed to poor team chemistry.

After college 
After graduating Loyola, Egan played three years in the short-lived North American Basketball League. From 1964 to 1967, he played for the Twin City Sailors along with his former Loyola teammates Jerry Harkness and Les Hunter.

He also studied at Loyola University Chicago School of Law. He worked in the Cook County State's Attorney's office in the late 1960s before starting his own criminal defense practice.

In 1980, he moved to the Chicago-area village of River Forest, Illinois, having previously lived in the village of Riverside, Illinois. He has five children, two of them from his current marriage to Mary Egan, whom he met at the law office. Egan was one of several former Loyola players who was a fixture in the stands during the Ramblers' 2018 run to the Final Four.

References

External links 

 College stats at Sports Reference
 NABL stats at nasljerseys.com

1940s births
Living people
American men's basketball players
Basketball players from Chicago
Lawyers from Chicago
Loyola Ramblers men's basketball players
Point guards